Old America Stores was an arts and crafts retailer as well as a framing and custom floral store founded in 1980 by Wayne Brush, and was based in Howe, Texas with most of its stores located in the south. It was at one time owned by Campbell Taggart. Old America carried a variety of crafts, home decor, floral and framing products. After change of upper management with the departures of Wayne Brush and John Hightower in 1994 and 1995 respectively, Old America began a quick decline in sales and profit.  As a result of this decline, Old America started closing stores and filed for bankruptcy in 1999 and liquidated all of its 59 remaining stores.

Defunct retail companies of the United States
Retail companies established in 1980
Companies based in Texas
Grayson County, Texas
Companies that filed for Chapter 11 bankruptcy in 1999
Retail companies disestablished in 1999
Defunct companies based in Texas
1980 establishments in Texas
1999 disestablishments in Texas